Alpine skiing at the 2018 Winter Olympics was held from 12 to 24 February at Yongpyong Alpine Centre (slalom and giant slalom) at the Alpensia Sports Park in PyeongChang and at the Jeongseon Alpine Centre (speed events) in Jeongseon, South Korea.

In June 2015, the International Olympic Committee approved the addition of a mixed team event, bringing the total of medal events in alpine skiing to eleven. It was the last event on the schedule.

Qualification

A maximum of 320 quota spots were available to athletes to compete at the games. A maximum of twenty-two athletes could be entered by a National Olympic Committee, with a maximum of fourteen men or fourteen women. A total of sixteen countries also qualified for the inaugural team event. There were two qualification standards for the games: an A standard and a B standard.

Competition schedule

Notes
 Men's downhill was postponed (high winds) from 11 to 15 February.
 Women's giant slalom was postponed (high winds) from 12 to 15 February.
 Women's slalom was postponed (high winds) from 14 to 16 February.
 Men's super-G was postponed (scheduling conflict) from 15 to 16 February.
 Women's combined was moved forward 24 hours (due to scheduled high winds) from 23 to 22 February.

Course information

 Estimates - data from  official Olympic venue websites.

Medal summary

Medal table

Men's events

Women's events

Team event

Participating nations
A total of 322 athletes from 80 nations (including the IOC's designation of Olympic Athletes from Russia) were scheduled to participate (the numbers of athletes are shown in parentheses).

References

External links
 Official Results Book – Alpine Skiing

 
Alpine skiing at the Winter Olympics
Winter Olympics
Alpine skiing competitions in South Korea
2018 Winter Olympics events